Izudin Čavrković (28 July 1941 – 2 January 2007) was a Bosnian-Serbian classical and jazz trumpeter, member of the Belgrade Philharmonic Orchestra and professor at the University of Priština Faculty of Arts, Serbia and Sarajevo Music Academy, Bosnia and Herzegovina. His former students hold teaching positions and play in major classical and jazz orchestras in former Yugoslavia and abroad.

References
Maksimović, M. (1971): Beogradska filharmonija 1951-1971, Beogradska filharmonija, Beograd
 List of teachers at the Sarajevo Music Academy

1941 births
2007 deaths
Musicians from Tuzla
Bosniaks of Bosnia and Herzegovina
Academic staff of the University of Sarajevo
Academic staff of the University of Pristina
20th-century classical musicians
20th-century trumpeters